Major General George Henry Inglis,  (22 August 1902 – 2 March 1979) was a senior British Army officer.

Education
Inglis was educated at Ardvreck School, Crieff, Wellington College, Berkshire and the Royal Military Academy, Woolwich.

Military career
Inglis was commissioned as a second lieutenant in the Royal Artillery in 1922. During the Second World War, he served in France, with South East Asia Command (SEAC) and Middle East Land Forces (MELF). Promoted to brigadier in 1944, he was mentioned in despatches for service in Burma in 1946 and again for service in Palestine in 1949. 

In 1948 Inglis was commanding officer of the 18th Training Brigade, Oswestry. He was appointed a Commander of the Order of the British Empire in June 1950. He was General Officer Commanding the 52nd (Lowland) Infantry Division from 1950 to 1952. He was promoted to major general in 1951, and appointed a Companion of the Order of the Bath in 1952.

Inglis became General Officer Commanding, Nigeria district in 1953 before retiring from the British Army in 1956. From 1960 to 1967 he served as colonel commandant of the Royal Artillery.

Appointments
Inglis was appointed Justice of the peace (JP) Cumberland in 1958; High Sheriff of Cumberland in 1961; deputy lieutenant of Cumberland in 1962 and vice-lieutenant of Cumberland from 1969 to 1974. He also served as vice-president of The Royal British Legion from 1978 to 1979 and president of the North West area from 1973 to 1979.

References

External links
National Portrait Gallery
Generals of World War II

1902 births
1979 deaths
People educated at Ardvreck School
People educated at Wellington College, Berkshire
Graduates of the Royal Military Academy, Woolwich
Royal Artillery officers
British Army brigadiers of World War II
British Army major generals
Companions of the Order of the Bath
Commanders of the Order of the British Empire
High Sheriffs of Cumberland
Deputy Lieutenants of Cumberland
British military personnel of the Palestine Emergency